Robert Ihly (born May 5, 1963 in Asbest, Soviet Union) is a retired race walker from Germany, who was one of the nation's leading athletes in race walking in the 1990s. He represented Germany thrice at the Summer Olympics, starting in 1992 (Barcelona, Spain).

Achievements

References
  Profile
 sports-reference

1963 births
Living people
German male racewalkers
Athletes (track and field) at the 1992 Summer Olympics
Athletes (track and field) at the 1996 Summer Olympics
Athletes (track and field) at the 2000 Summer Olympics
Olympic athletes of Germany